Jacques Moeschal may refer to:
 Jacques Moeschal (footballer) (1900–1956), Belgian international footballer
 Jacques Moeschal (architect) (1913–2004), Belgian architect and sculptor